Smith E. Alford (c. 1877 – February 20, 1949) was an American college football player and coach. He played football at Kentucky State College—now known as the University of Kentucky—from 1893 to 1896, playing quarterback and captaining the 1895 Kentucky State College Blue and White football team. The following year, he moved to halfback and was also an assistant coach for the team. In 1897, Alford moved on to Washington and Lee University to study law and played for Washington and Lee Generals football team. Alford served as the head football coach at Geneva College in Beaver Falls, Pennsylvania for one season, in 1904, compiling a record of 1–4–2.

Alford later coached football at Flushing High School in Flushing, New York. He was also a construction contractor in Queens. Alford died on February 20, 1949, in Flushing, New York.

Head coaching record

College

References

1870s births
1949 deaths
19th-century players of American football
19th-century baseball players
American football fullbacks
American football halfbacks
American football quarterbacks
Baseball catchers
Geneva Golden Tornadoes football coaches
Kentucky Wildcats football players
Washington and Lee Generals baseball players
Washington and Lee Generals football players
High school football coaches in New York (state)